Gennady Mikhailovich Smirnov (16 January 1955 – 2 September 2000) was a Soviet footballer who played as a striker in the 1970s and 1980s.

Career
Born in Saratov, Reinhold began playing football with local side Sokol Saratov. He scored 34 league goals for the club in just over two seasons, earning a move to Soviet Top League side Krylia Sovetov Kyubyshev in 1997. Shortly after, Smirnov entered military service and was sent to play for SKA-Khabarovsk. Over the course of three Soviet Second League seasons Smirnov scored 56 goals for SKA-Khabarovsk, scoring a club-best 27 goals in a single season, making him the club's fifth all-time leading goal-scorer.

After his success at SKA Khabarovsk, Smirnov joined Soviet Top League side Spartak Moscow, but he only made a single substitute's appearance for Spartak. His greatest successes followed as Smirnov scored 71 league goals for Soviet First League side Fakel Voronezh over the next four seasons. During his career, Smirnov scored 226 goals in the Soviet Top, First and Second Leagues, making him the fourth all-time leading goal-scorer in those three leagues.

Personal
Smirnov married Elena Krestenenko, also from Saratov, when he was age 21. They had a son, Maksim, while Gennady was playing for Spartak Moscow in 1980. However, after a few seasons with Fakel Voronezh, he left his family and went home to Saratov. After he retired from playing, Smirnov struggled to find work, and he was stabbed to death by drinking companions in his apartment at age 45.

Smirnov's brother, Yuri, was a professional footballer who played for Sokol Saratov, Torpedo Moscow, CSKA Moscow, Lokomotiv Moscow and Krylia Sovetov Kyubyshev, and was a Soviet Cup-winner. His son, Maksim, played semi-professional football for FC Yelets, FC Dynamo Voronezh, FC Lokomotiv Liski and FC Metallurg-Oskol Stary Oskol.

References

External links
Profile at Footballfacts.ru

1955 births
2000 deaths
Soviet footballers
FC Sokol Saratov players
PFC Krylia Sovetov Samara players
FC SKA-Khabarovsk players
FC Spartak Moscow players
FC Fakel Voronezh players
Navbahor Namangan players
FC Vorskla Poltava players
FC Salyut Belgorod players
Association football forwards
FC Metallurg Lipetsk players